"Break Every Rule" is a song by recording artist Tina Turner. It was the title track to both Turner's 1986 album of the same name and the name of her 1987-88 "Break Every Rule World Tour". It was released as a single in April 1987 to support the album and the tour. The song found limited success on the US and UK singles charts, although reached as far as #21 on the Austrian Top 40 Charts. The music video shows Turner performing on stage as well as behind-the-scenes footage of Turner and her band from the tour. The song was written by British composer and singer Rupert Hine and his then girlfriend Jeanette Obstoj, who had previously composed "I Might Have Been Queen" which was featured on Turner's Private Dancer album. The "Break Every Rule" 12" single included both an Extended Dance Mix and an Extended Rock Mix.

Music video

The official music video for the song was directed by Andy Morahan.

Versions and remixes
 7" edit – 3:48
 Album version – 4:02
 Extended Dance Mix – 8:46
 Extended Rock Mix – 7:02

Personnel 
 Tina Turner – lead and backing vocals 
 Rupert Hine – all other instruments, backing vocals
 Jamie West-Oram – guitars

Chart performance

References 

1986 songs
1987 singles
Capitol Records singles
Music videos directed by Andy Morahan
Song recordings produced by Rupert Hine
Songs written by Rupert Hine
Tina Turner songs
Songs written by Jeannette Obstoj